The Troubles in Newtownabbey recounts incidents during and the effects of the Troubles in Newtownabbey, County Antrim, Northern Ireland.

Incidents in Newtownabbey during the Troubles resulting in two or more fatalities:

1974
31 January 1974 - Terence McCafferty (37) and James McCloskey (29), both Catholic civilians, were shot dead during a gun attack by the Ulster Freedom Fighters on a workers' hut at a Northern Ireland Electricity Service building site, Rush Park, Newtownabbey.
11 February 1974 - Thomas Donaghy (16) and Margaret McErlean (18), both Catholic civilians, were shot dead by the Ulster Freedom Fighters as they arrived at their workplace, Abbey Meat Packers, Glenville Road, Newtownabbey. McErlean died on 18 February 1974.

1994
17 June 1994 - Cecil Dougherty (30) and William Corrigan (32), both Protestant civilians, were shot dead during an Ulster Volunteer Force gun attack on a workers hut, Rushpark, off Shore Road, Newtownabbey. They were assumed to have been Catholics. Corrigan died on 10 July 1994. The event took place one day before the Loughinisland massacre.

2012
25 October 2012 - Danny McKay, a Catholic civilian aged 36, was shot dead in his house by Correct Action Against Drugs (CAAD) for supposed involvement in drug dealing.

See also 
The Troubles in Jordanstown
The Troubles in Monkstown (Antrim)
UDA South East Antrim Brigade

References 

Newtownabbey
Newtownabbey